Lobesia hecista is a species of moth of the family Tortricidae. It is found in Nigeria.

The wingspan is about 10.5 mm. The ground colour of the forewings is cream, slightly mixed with pink in the distal part of the wing. The strigulation and markings are brown. The hindwings are pale brown.

The species lives on the African continent. Some live in Nigeria.

Etymology
The species name refers to the size of the species and is derived from Greek hekistos (meaning the smallest).

References

External links
 Accessions to the Afrotropical fauna of Tortricidae (Lepidoptera), 2

Moths described in 2013
Olethreutini